Sclerophyton is a genus of lichen-forming fungi in the family Opegraphaceae. It has about 15 species. The genus was circumscribed by German lichenologist Franz Gerhard Eschweiler in 1824, with Sclerophyton elegans assigned as the type species.

Species
Sclerophyton aptrootii 
Sclerophyton conspicuum 
Sclerophyton elegans 
Sclerophyton extenuatum 
Sclerophyton fluorescens 
Sclerophyton hillii 
Sclerophyton indicum 
Sclerophyton insularum 
Sclerophyton madagascariense 
Sclerophyton puncticulatum 
Sclerophyton seriale 
Sclerophyton stigmaticum 
Sclerophyton syncesioides 
Sclerophyton trinidadense 
Sclerophyton vertex

References

Arthoniomycetes
Lichen genera
Arthoniomycetes genera
Taxa described in 1824
Taxa named by Franz Gerhard Eschweiler